Coregonus bezola was a species of freshwater whitefish in the family Salmonidae. It was endemic to the Lac du Bourget in Savoie, France where it was pelagic in deep water. It is known from specimens collected in the late 19th century, and was reported by fishermen to have disappeared in the 1960s.

References

 

bezola
Fish extinctions since 1500
Extinct animals of Europe
Fish described in 1888
Endemic fish of Metropolitan France